The Samsung Galaxy A9 (2018) is a midrange Android smartphone produced by Samsung Electronics as part of the Samsung Galaxy A series. It was announced on 11 October 2018 at the A Galaxy event in Kuala Lumpur, Malaysia, as the successor to the Samsung Galaxy A9 (2016). Galaxy A9 (2018) is the world's first smartphone that features 4 different cameras on the rear. It features a 6.3 inch Super AMOLED Infinity Display with curved edges similar to the Samsung Galaxy A8 (2018) and supports Dolby Atmos immersive sound technology. It is the brand ambassador for Ayushmann Khurrana. It is the predecessor of Samsung Galaxy A70.

Specifications 
The Galaxy A9 (2018) consists of the following specifications.

Hardware 
The smartphone is powered by Qualcomm Snapdragon 660 SoC with an octa-core processor consisting of 4 performance 2.2GHz Kryo 260 and 4 efficient 1.8GHz Kyro 260 cores and Adreno 512 GPU backed by 6 GB/8 GB of RAM and 128 GB of internal storage that is expandable to 512 GB via a dedicated microSD card slot.

Display 
The A9 (2018) features a 6.3 inch Full HD+ (1080x2220 pixels) Super AMOLED display with 18.5:9 aspect ratio. The display features curved edges similar to the S9's Infinity Display but with larger bezels and without curved sides.

Cameras 
The quad camera setup features a primary 24MP f/1.7 sensor for normal photography, an ultra-wide 8MP f/2.4 sensor with a 120 degrees viewing angle, a telephoto 10MP f/2.4 with 2x optical zoom and a 5MP depth sensor for effects such as Bokeh. The front camera has been upgraded to a 24MP sensor, complete with its own dedicated flash.

Video recording is possible with 2160p and 1080p, both at 30 frames per second. The device lacks slow motion video recording.

Software

Operating system 
It runs Android 8.0 "Oreo" with Samsung Experience 9.0 out of the box. It is upgradable to Android 9.0 Pie.

Miscellaneous 
Its extra features include Bixby, with Bixby button, Always-on Display and a Gorilla Glass front panel with a reflective glass back panel. It is available in Caviar Black, Lemonade Blue and Bubblegum Pink variants, with some models supporting Dual SIM. It supports fast charging over its USB-C port.

Availability
Following the unveiling, Samsung announced that the device will go on sale in selected markets from November 2018 with future plans to release in other countries.

Galaxy A9s
The A9s are similar in design and specifications to the A9, and were destined for sale in the Chinese market only. The addition of an 's' is to differentiate it from the current Samsung Galaxy A9 Star, which is based on the Samsung Galaxy A8 and also destined for only the Chinese market.

References

External links 
 

Android (operating system) devices
Samsung Galaxy
Samsung smartphones
Mobile phones introduced in 2018
Mobile phones with multiple rear cameras
Mobile phones with 4K video recording
Discontinued smartphones